Diarmuid Ó Mathúna is a Gaelic Athletic Association based in Castletown-Kinneigh, in Cork, Republic of Ireland. The club has both hurling and Gaelic football teams. The club is part of Cork GAA and also part of the Carbery GAA division. In 2008, the club reached its first ever county final, when it lost to Dripsey in the Cork Junior Hurling Championship final.

Honours
 Munster Junior B Football Championship runner up 2012
 Cork Junior Hurling Championship Runners-Up 2008
 Cork Junior B Football Championship Winner 1995, 2012
 Cork Minor A Hurling Championship Winners (1) 2000
 West Cork Junior A Hurling Championship Winners (5) 2001, 2002, 2005, 2008, 2010  Runners-Up 1983, 1993, 2006, 2014 
 West Cork Junior Football Championship Runners-Up 2002
 Carbery Junior B Hurling Championship Winners (2) 1974, 1981
 West Cork Junior B Football Championship Winners (1) 1995  Runners-Up 1974, 1983, 1992, 1994
 Carbery Junior C Hurling Championship Winners (2) 1998, 2001  Runners-Up 1993, 1995
 West Cork Junior D Football Championship Winners (2) 1989, 2017  Runners-Up 1985, 2011
 West Cork Minor A Hurling Championship Winners (2) 1999, 2000  Runners-Up 1993
 West Cork Minor B Hurling Championship Winners (2) 1987, 1992, 1995  Runners-Up 1976, 1986, 1988
 West Cork Minor B Football Championship Runners-Up 1997, 1999
 West Cork Under-21 Hurling Championship Winners (2) 2002, 2003  Runners-Up 1998
 West Cork Under-21 B Hurling Championship Winners (2) 1985, 1992, 2015  Runners-Up 2005
 West Cork Under-21 C Hurling Championship Winners (1) 2013 Runners-Up 2008
 West Cork Under-21 C Football Championship Winners (2) 2005, 2008  Runners-Up 2009, 2013

Notable players
 Mick Fehilly - part of Cork team that won the 2009 All-Ireland Intermediate Hurling Championship.

References

External sources
 Official Diarmuid O'Mahuna's Club website
 Report on 2000 Minor A County Final

Hurling clubs in County Cork
Gaelic football clubs in County Cork
Gaelic games clubs in County Cork